The Roman Catholic Diocese of Mbinga is a diocese located in Mbinga in the Ecclesiastical province of Songea in Tanzania.

History
 December 22, 1986: Established as Diocese of Mbinga from the Diocese of Songea

Leadership
 Bishops of Mbinga (Roman rite)
 Bishop Emmanuel Mapunda (December 22, 1986 — March 12, 2011)
 Bishop John Chrisostom Ndimbo (since March 12, 2011)

See also
Roman Catholicism in Tanzania

Sources
 GCatholic.org
 Catholic Hierarchy

Mbinga
Christian organizations established in 1986
Roman Catholic dioceses and prelatures established in the 20th century
Mbinga, Roman Catholic Diocese of
1986 establishments in Tanzania